Big Brother Albania 2 was the second season of the Albanian series of the worldwide franchise of Big Brother. It launched on Saturday, 7 February 2009, with fourteen Housemates entering the House. The show was set to run for 99 days until Saturday, 16 May 2009, and the winner, Qetsor Ferunaj received a €70,000 prize.
Big Brother 2 (Albania) aired on two cable channels 24 hours a day on the Digit-Alb cable network, as well as on two additional channels on Digitalb Mobile. Daily reviews were shown Monday through Saturday on Top Channel. The eviction show aired on Saturdays at 21:00 CET, while a Sunday edition closed off the week.
The main host was Arbana Osmani, while Eno Popi hosted a Sunday morning edition called "Big Brother Albania Fans' Club", featuring dialogues with eliminated contestants and fans of the show. A panel of opinionists was present during the main Saturday show. Arjan Konomi, a magazine editor, and Virusi, a composer and songwriter from Kosovo, had permanent positions in this panel, while different singers, psychologists and relevant art figures were sometimes invited to give their insight.

Housemates

Nominations table

Notes

: In round nine of nominations housemates had to make a "chain of immunity" starting with Mimoza and continuing until only four housemates were not immune. The four housemates not part of the chain were automatically nominated for eviction.
: In round twelve of nominations each female housemate had to nominate a male housemate, who would then be automatically up for eviction. The next female housemate to nominate could not nominate a housemate that had already been nominated. The male housemate that was not nominated then had to automatically nominate one of the female housemates.
: In round fourteen the nominations were done in secret with each housemate writing down on a sheet of paper who they wanted to nominate. Anjeza received the most nominations with 5 and was up for eviction. The public then voted for whether they wanted to save or evict Anjeza. If she received more evict votes she would be evicted, if she received more save votes she would be saved and immune from the next round of nominations.
: A surprise eviction took place in the final week in order to determine who the finalists would be except from Bjordi who received exemption from the mothers of the housemates.

References

External links
Big Brother Albania 5
Big Brother Albania Forum

2009 Albanian television seasons
02

pl:Big Brother (Albania)#2 edycja